Robert Schermerhorn (1943 – April 23, 2018) was an American college basketball coach.

Schermerhorn came from South Bend, Indiana and played for church leagues but did not make varsity at South Bend Central High School. After high school, he joined the Marines and served in Vietnam, playing basketball in the jungle and improvising a court. He walked onto the basketball team at Orange Coast College in 1968 and seldom played, but impressed coach Herb Livesay with his knowledge of the game and Livesay set him up with basketball camps during the summer. Schermerhorn became head coach at Canyon High School in 1974 and coached for four seasons. He coached at Chaffey College until 1980, when it ceased its basketball program.

From 1980 to 1983, Schermerhorn served as assistant coach at UC Irvine under Bill Mulligan, where he helped develop the talents of Kevin Magee. In 1983, he became head coach at Southern Utah, serving until he accepted an assistant position at Arizona State in 1987. In 1989, he became the interim coach at Arizona State after Steve Patterson resigned under pressure. Schermerhorn guided the team to a 2–7 record but had an upset of UCLA. He was not retained when the administration wanted a big name coach.

Schermerhorn accepted the head coaching job at Riverside City College, where he went 17–16 his first season. By his fourth season, the team won 30 games. He was selected as the Orange Empire Conference (OEC) Coach of the Year in 1994 and 1996. By the end of his tenure in 1998, he had guided the team to a 225–98 record, becoming the second winningest coach in school history. He took over as the school's athletic director and was inducted into the California Community College Men's Basketball Hall of Fame in 2003. When Schermerhorn retired in 2005, he took over as the coach at Fullerton College for a season, then became the athletic director at Santa Ana College until 2010. He coached for three seasons at Holy Cross College (Indiana) and led the team to 32 wins and their first Chicagoland Collegiate Athletic Conference post-season tournament victory in 2012 before retiring the following year.

On April 23, 2018, Schermerhorn died of a heart attack after coming back from a doctor's appointment.

References

External links
 Coaching record @ sports-reference.com

1943 births
2018 deaths
American men's basketball coaches
Arizona State Sun Devils men's basketball coaches
Basketball coaches from Indiana
College men's basketball head coaches in the United States
High school basketball coaches in the United States
Junior college men's basketball coaches in the United States
Southern Utah Thunderbirds men's basketball coaches
UC Irvine Anteaters men's basketball coaches
Basketball players from South Bend, Indiana